Shalhevet or Shalheveth is a Hebrew personal name meaning flame and may refer to the following:

Shalheveth Freier, Israeli scientist
Shalhevet Pass (2000–2001), Israeli victim of terrorism
Shalhevet High School, a Jewish school in Los Angeles, California